Cape Lookout State Park is a state park on Cape Lookout in the U.S. state of Oregon. It is located in Tillamook County, south of the city of Tillamook, on a sand spit between Netarts Bay and the Pacific Ocean.

References

External links

Oregon Coast
Parks in Tillamook County, Oregon
State parks of Oregon